Sven Lennart Bergelin (10 June 1925 – 4 November 2008) was a Swedish tennis player and coach. As a player, for AIK, Bergelin won nine Swedish championship singles titles between 1945 and 1955, and the French Open doubles title in 1948. Bergelin is best known for his work with Björn Borg, whom he trained between 1971 and 1983, helping him to win 11 Grand Slam tournaments. Bergelin also captained Sweden to its first Davis Cup title.

Tennis career
During a ten-year period, between 1946 and 1955, Bergelin was ranked among the top 10 amateur players in the world, reaching World No. 9 in John Olliff's 1948 amateur rankings. He won 20 national championships (9 singles and 11 doubles) and became the first Swedish player ever to win a grand slam, as he and Jaroslav Drobný won the French doubles championship in 1948. Bergelin played 89 Davis Cup matches representing Sweden and won 63 of these. He played the last DC game, at the age of 40, together with Jan-Erik Lundqvist. Between 1971 and 1976, Bergelin captained the Swedish DC team and in 1975 he led them to victory as they defeated Czechoslovakia in the finals.

Bergelin was awarded the Svenska Dagbladet Gold Medal in 1950.

Coaching career

Between 1974 and 1981, he and Björn Borg won 11 Grand Slam titles (6 French Open and 5 Wimbledon) of 16 Grand Slam finals became the first player-coach combination who won more than 10 major titles in the Open-era. During this period helped Borg become the first player in the Open Era to win three majors without dropping a set. Borg remains the only male player to win the Channel-Slam (French Open, Wimbledon back-to-back wins) in the same year for 3 consecutive years. Furthermore, as of today, his protege still holds a number of records; winning 41 consecutive sets at French Open (1979-1981) and being undefeated for 41 consecutive matches in Wimbledon (1976-1981).

Death
Bergelin died in 2008. According to Peter Bengtsson, a spokesman for the Swedish Tennis Association, he died from heart failure at a Stockholm hospital.

Grand Slam finals

Doubles (1 title)

See also
List of Sweden Davis Cup team representatives

References

External links
 
 
 

1925 births
2008 deaths
Swedish male tennis players
Grand Slam (tennis) champions in men's doubles
French Championships junior (tennis) champions
French Championships (tennis) champions
Swedish tennis coaches
People from Alingsås